Matthew Griswold may refer to:

Matthew Griswold (governor) (1715–1799), Governor of Connecticut
Matthew Griswold (congressman) (1833–1919), U.S. Congressman from Pennsylvania
Matthew Griswold (singer), American singer and songwriter